Théodose Achille Louis Vicomte du Moncel or  Théodore du Moncel (6 March 1821 – 16 February 1884) was a prominent French physicist and advocate of the use of electricity. He invented many electrical devices and wrote several books. He was also a proficient artist, making high-quality prints of scientific and cultural interest.

He also worked as a popularizer of knowledge on electricity.

In 1879, he founded the journal La lumière électrique.

He is one of the founders of the Société Nationale des Sciences Naturelles et Mathématiques of Cherbourg and was a member of the French Academy of Sciences.

He was conseiller général of the Manche département (1861–1870) (Canton of Cherbourg-Octeville-Sud-Ouest).

Personal life 
He married Camille Bachasson de Montalivet (1 September 1832–1887) on 28 November 1849. They had one daughter, Amélie du Moncel (1851–1909), who married Georges Dursus, comte de Courcy (born 1838), and they had two children:
Yvan Dursus de Courcy (born 1873), who married Mathilde Buffenoir
Charles Dursus de Courcy
Camille Dursus de Courcy
Hervé Dursus de Courcy
Hervé Dursus de Courcy (born 1876)

Works

Books

Articles 
Many articles in La Lumière électrique, among them:
 
 
 
 
 
 
 

Academy of Science presentation:

Notes

Sources 
 
 
 
 

Scientists from Paris
1821 births
1884 deaths
French physicists
French technology writers
Members of the French Academy of Sciences
Officiers of the Légion d'honneur